KQBG (99.5 FM, "99-5 The Bridge") is a radio station broadcasting a hot adult contemporary format. Licensed to Rock Island, Washington, United States, the station serves the Wenatchee area. It is currently owned by Townsquare Media and licensed to Townsquare License, LLC and features programming from Premiere Networks.

History
The station went on the air as KXAA on June 24, 1988. On February 1, 2000, it changed its call sign to KAAP.

On May 6, 2016, at noon, KAAP changed its format from adult contemporary to hot adult contemporary, branded as "99.5 The Bridge". The first song on The Bridge was "SexyBack" by Justin Timberlake. The station also changed its call sign from KAAP to KQBG.

Ownership
In June 2006, a deal was reached for KAAP to be acquired by Cherry Creek Media from Fisher Radio Regional Group as part of a 24-station deal with a total reported sale price of $33.3 million.

References

External links

QBG
Hot adult contemporary radio stations in the United States
Radio stations established in 1991
1991 establishments in Washington (state)
Townsquare Media radio stations